The 1971 Virginia Slims of San Diego was a women's tennis tournament played on outdoor hard courts at the Morley Field Sports Complex in San Diego, California in the United States that was part of the 1971 Women's Tennis Circuit. It was the inaugural edition of the tournament and was held from April 22 through April 25, 1971. First-seeded Billie Jean King won the singles title and earned $2,5000 first-prize money.

Finals

Singles
 Billie Jean King defeated  Rosie Casals 4–6, 7–5, 6–1

Doubles
 Rosie Casals /  Billie Jean King defeated  Françoise Dürr /  Judy Tegart Dalton 6–7, 6–2, 6–3

References

Virginia Slims of San Diego
Southern California Open
Virginia Slims
Virginia Slims